Law, Respect, Expertise (PRO 2022) is a right-wing populist political party in the Czech Republic.

History
The party was founded in June 2022 by figures linked to Charter 2022, an initiative opposing COVID-19 restrictions and vaccinations. Lawyer Jindřich Rajchl, a former member of the Tricolour Citizens' Movement, became its first leader. The party largely focused on energetics during the press conferences held to launch the party. In July 2022 the party announced it would nominate seven candidates for the 2022 Czech Senate election, including Hana Zelená and Ivan Noveský.

The party gained some media attention during August 2022 when Rajchl appeared in a Sanep poll for preferred Prime Minister, finishing fourth with 7.9%. On 3 September 2022 Rajchl and other prominent members of the party appeared at an anti-government demonstration on Wenceslas Square.

PRO participated in the 2022 Czech Senate election with seven candidates. Jana Zwyrtek Hamplová, who was endorsed by PRO, advanced to the second round and eventually won the seat.

References

External links
Official website

2022 establishments in the Czech Republic
Political parties established in 2022
Eurosceptic parties in the Czech Republic
Far-right political parties in the Czech Republic
Right-wing populism in the Czech Republic
Nationalist parties in the Czech Republic
Right-wing populist parties
Right-wing parties in the Czech Republic